K. P. Anbalagan also spelt as K. P. Anbazhagan (born 30 April 1958) is a Tamil Nadu politician from the All India Anna Dravida Munnetra Kazhagam party and the former Minister for Higher Education and Agriculture department in Tamil Nadu. KP Anbalagan was born on 30 April 1958 in Dharmapuri, Tamil Nadu, India. He won consecutively for 5 terms (2001-Till date) as a Member of Legislative Assembly of Palacode Constituency which record he holds with his party counterparts O.Panneerselvam and Pollachi V.Jayaraman.

Career 
He pursued his career into mainstream politics in 1996 and joined the AIADMK party in the same year. He was elected to the Tamil Nadu Legislative Assembly from Palacode constituency in 2001 and 2016. He was appointed the secretary of the Dharmapuri District in 2016 by the then Chief Minister of the state J. Jayalalitha. He was earlier serving as the Minister for Higher Education in the Government of Tamil Nadu and he was previously appointed as he was previously the Minister for Municipal Administration, Rural Development & Information Minister of the state in 2009–2011.

On 19 June 2020, while being the Education Minister he himself reportedly confirmed that he was tested positive for COVID-19 becoming the second major MLA from Tamil Nadu to be diagnosed with the virus after J. Anbazhagan..However the chief minister Edappadi K. Palaniswami denied the reports regarding Anbalagan diagnosed with coronavirus.

Electoral performance

References 

1958 births
All India Anna Dravida Munnetra Kazhagam politicians
Living people
Tamil Nadu MLAs 2011–2016
Tamil Nadu MLAs 2016–2021
People from Dharmapuri district
State cabinet ministers of Tamil Nadu
Tamil Nadu MLAs 2021–2026
Tamil Nadu politicians